Trisha is an Indian actress and model who appears primarily in Tamil and Telugu films. She was first seen in 1999 in a supporting role in Jodi, then in the music video of Falguni Pathak's song "Meri Chunar Udd Udd Jaye". The first project she accepted as a lead actress was Priyadarshan's Lesa Lesa, but a delay in the film's release meant that her first appearance in a lead role was in Ameer's directorial debut Mounam Pesiyadhe in 2002, which was a commercial success.

The following year, Trisha appeared as a terminally ill woman in  Manasellam, which was a commercial failure. Her next release in 2003 was Hari's action film, Saamy in which she played a soft-spoken Brahmin girl and attracted praise for her performance. The film became a major commercial success, resulting in Trisha receiving new offers, including those from several high-budget productions. Lesa Lesa, which was to have been her debut as a lead actress, was released next. This romantic musical, based on the 1998 Malayalam film Summer in Bethlehem, earned her the ITFA Best New Actress Award. Following Lesa Lesa, she starred in Alai and Enakku 20 Unakku 18  both of which were commercial failures. She made her debut in Telugu cinema in the same year with Nee Manasu Naaku Telusu, which was also unsuccessful.

Trisha's next Telugu release was Varsham in 2004. It was a major success, and won her the Filmfare Best Actress Award (Telugu). It also resulted in her receiving more offers for roles in Telugu films. Later in 2004, Trisha played the role of a damsel in distress where a kabaddi player tries to save from a corrupt politician who wants to marry her in Ghilli. It was a major commercial success. She appeared in Mani Ratnam's political drama Aaytha Ezhuthu (2004), starring as part of an ensemble cast that included Siddharth, R. Madhavan and Suriya. The Telugu romantic comedy Nuvvostanante Nenoddantana (2005) featured Trisha as a village girl and was a commercial success. It earned her another Filmfare Award and her first Nandi Award for Best Actress. She reprised the role in the Tamil remake Unakkum Enakkum (2006) which was also successful. Selvaraghavan's Telugu film Aadavari Matalaku Arthale Verule (2007) won Trisha her third Filmfare Award. The same year she featured opposite Ajith Kumar in A. L. Vijay's Kireedam. In 2008, her releases Bheemaa and Kuruvi both failed commercially, while Abhiyum Naanum and Krishna earned her Filmfare nominations for Best Actress in the Tamil and Telugu categories respectively.

Trisha starred in two films released in 2009: Sarvam and Sankham. The former was commercially unsuccessful, while the latter was critically derided. The following year, she played a Kerala Christian girl in Gautham Vasudev Menon's romance Vinnaithaandi Varuvaayaa. It was a major commercial success and, as well as being a breakthrough film in her career, earned her a Filmfare nomination for Best Actress (Tamil). The same year, she made her Hindi cinema debut with Khatta Meetha. Although a critical and commercial failure, it earned her nomination for a Filmfare Award for Best Female Debut. Her sole Telugu release that year was Namo Venkatesa. Both her 2011 releases – Teen Maar and Mankatha – were successful. She had two releases in 2012: Bodyguard (a Telugu remake of the 2010 Malayalam film of the same name) and Dammu.

Trisha appeared in two Tamil films in 2013: the mystery thriller Samar, and Endrendrum Punnagai, which earned her a Filmfare nomination. Her sole release in 2014 was Power, which marked her debut in Kannada cinema. Trisha's 2015 films included the crime thriller Yennai Arindhaal, the comedy Sakalakala Vallavan, the Tamil-Telugu bilingual thriller Thoongaa Vanam / Cheekati Rajyam, and the sports drama Bhooloham. In 2016, she appeared in the comedy horror films Aranmanai 2 and the Tamil-Telugu bilingual Nayaki (spelt Nayagi in Tamil), followed by the political thriller Kodi, which earned her the Filmfare Critics Award for Best Actress – Tamil. Trisha won her first Filmfare Award for Best Actress (Tamil) for '96 (2018), and in the same year made her debut in Malayalam cinema in Hey Jude.

Feature films

Short films

Television

Music videos

See also 
 List of awards and nominations received by Trisha

Notes

References

Bibliography 
  Alt URL

External links 
 

Actress filmographies
Indian filmographies